Alok R. Chaturvedi is a Professor of Information Systems and the founder and the Director of SEAS Laboratory at the Krannert School of Management, Purdue University. His research is focused on using artificial intelligence, computational ecology, and enterprise integration for wargaming enterprise situations. He received a Ph.D. (1989) and M.S (1985) in Management Information Systems from the University of Wisconsin–Milwaukee and a B.Sc (1980) in Mechanical Engineering from B.I.T Ranchi (India).

Alok R. Chaturvedi is also:
the director of Purdue Homeland Security Institute, United States;
the founder, chairman, and the CEO of Simulex Inc.;
the technical lead for the Sentient World Simulation project initiated by US Joint Forces Command;
the principal investigator and the project director for several major grants from National Science Foundation, Indiana 21st Century Research and Technology Fund, Office of Naval Research and others.

In 2005, he was awarded the Sagamore of the Wabash by the Governor of Indiana, the lowest civilian honor which the Governor of Indiana bestows for his service to the state. He has also served as an adjunct research staff member at the Institute for Defense Analyses.

See also
Chaturvedi
Social simulation
Simulated reality

Sources and notes

Living people
Artificial intelligence researchers
American computer scientists
University of Wisconsin–Milwaukee alumni
Birla Institute of Technology, Mesra alumni
Krannert School of Management faculty
Year of birth missing (living people)